Events from the year 1782 in Austria

Incumbents
 Monarch – Joseph II

Events

 16 July - Premiere of Wolfgang Amadeus Mozart's Die Entführung aus dem Serail at the Burgtheater, Vienna
 1782 Edict of Tolerance

Births

Deaths

References

 
Years of the 18th century in Austria